WRMA (95.7 FM) is a radio station broadcasting a Cubatón format. Licensed to North Miami Beach, Florida, United States, the station serves the Miami metropolitan area. The station is owned by Spanish Broadcasting System subsidiary WXDJ Licensing, Inc.

History
The station was assigned the call letters WRFM on July 8, 1986. On May 12, 1987, the station changed its call sign to WXDJ, and on January 7, 2014, to the current WRMA. The station's original format was new age jazz and it was called both The Wave and The Breeze. On August 15, 2016, WRMA changed formats to Cuban reggaetón or Cubatón, rebranded as "Ritmo 95.7".

Previous logo

References

External links

RMA
Radio stations established in 1986
Spanish Broadcasting System radio stations
RMA
1986 establishments in Florida